Donald Wayne Meyer (December 16, 1944 – May 18, 2014) was an American college basketball coach who completed his career in 2010 as head coach of the men's team at Northern State University.  He was once head coach at Hamline University and Lipscomb University.

Early life
Meyer was born in 1944 in Wayne, Nebraska. Meyer graduated with a major in physical education from the University of Northern Colorado and excelled in baseball and basketball, being named an NCAA All-American in 1966 while playing in the 1966 NCAA College Division Basketball Tournament. He graduated in 1967.

College basketball coaching career 
Meyer held the record for most wins by a men's basketball coach whose career included at least one stint with an NCAA member school, until it was surpassed by Duke University coach Mike Krzyzewski in November 2011. His career win total includes stints as a NAIA coach.

He is the subject of the book, Playing for Coach Meyer written by Steve Smiley, who played for Meyer as a point guard (1999–2004), and who served as an assistant coach from 2006 to 2008. Meyer is also the subject of a more extensive biography, How Lucky You Can Be: The Story of Coach Don Meyer, written by ESPN baseball analyst Buster Olney, who has had a close relationship with Meyer since Olney was assigned to cover baseball in Nashville while Meyer was coaching at Lipscomb.

Pat Summitt cites Meyer as a major influence on her development as a coach, noting in a 2009 interview:

He had 3 major rules:
Everybody takes notes.
Everybody says "please" and "thank you".
Everybody picks up trash.

Accident and cancer 
Meyer had cancer that was discovered in his liver and intestines (bowels) during emergency surgery after a car crash on September 5, 2008. His lower left leg had to be amputated below the knee due to injuries from the car crash. During the surgery they found cancer and later operated on it.

Awards 
At the ESPY Awards 2009, Meyer was awarded the Jimmy V (Jim Valvano) Award For Perseverance.

In February 2011, Coach Meyer was inducted into the Tennessee Sports Hall of Fame not only for his basketball coaching skills and records but was also recognized as an outstanding collegiate basketball and baseball athlete and administrator.

In 2012, Meyer was inducted into the South Dakota Hall of Fame.

Retirement and death
On February 22, 2010, Northern State announced that Meyer would be retiring at the end of the 2009–10 season after 38 years of coaching. Later that year, on June 30, the Naismith Memorial Basketball Hall of Fame announced that Meyer was that year's recipient of the John Bunn Award, given by the Hall for significant contributions to the sport.

Casey Bond, a Lipscomb alum, produced the independent film about Meyer called My Many Sons, along with producing partner Brad Wilson. The film was produced on a budget of between $2 and $5 million under Bond and Wilson's production company, Higher Purpose Entertainment, and was released in 2015, starring Judge Reinhold as Meyer. The filming took place in Nashville, Tennessee and Aberdeen, South Dakota.

Meyer died of complications from his cancer on May 18, 2014, aged 69, in Aberdeen, South Dakota.

Head coaching record

See also
 List of college men's basketball coaches with 600 wins

References

1944 births
2014 deaths
American amputees
American men's basketball coaches
American men's basketball players
Basketball coaches from Nebraska
Basketball players from Nebraska
College men's basketball head coaches in the United States
Deaths from cancer in South Dakota
Hamline Pipers men's basketball coaches
Lipscomb Bisons men's basketball coaches
Northern Colorado Bears men's basketball players
Northern State Wolves men's basketball coaches
People from Wayne, Nebraska
Utah Utes men's basketball coaches